Clinton station may refer to:

Clinton Depot (Minnesota), a historic railway station in Clinton, Minnesota
Clinton Depot (North Carolina), a historic railway station in Clinton, North Carolina
Clinton station (Connecticut), a commuter rail station in Clinton, Connecticut
Clinton station (Iowa), a railway station in Clinton, Iowa
Clinton station (CTA Blue Line), a subway station in Chicago, Illinois
Clinton station (CTA Green and Pink Lines), an ‘L’ station in Chicago, Illinois (also called Clinton/Lake)
Clinton station (Rochester), a proposed rapid transit station in Rochester, New York
Clinton Road station, a former commuter rail station in Garden City, New York
Clinton Street Station (Trenton), a passenger train station in Trenton, New Jersey
Clinton Street/Southeast 12th Avenue station, a light rail station in Portland, Oregon
Clinton–Washington Avenues (IND Crosstown Line), a New York City Subway station in Manhattan; serving the  train
Clinton–Washington Avenues (IND Fulton Street Line), a New York City Subway station in Manhattan; serving the  train

See also
Clinton Power Station, a power generating station near Clinton, Illinois
Clinton-Sherman Air Force Base, originally Naval Air Station Clinton